Kate Croser is an Australian film and television producer and screen executive. She is currently the Chief Executive Officer of the South Australian Film Corporation.

Notable films produced by Croser include romantic comedy Top End Wedding, time travel comedy The Infinite Man and the Iranian co-production My Tehran for Sale. She also produced the television action comedy series Danger 5.

Awards and recognition  
In 2009 Croser won the Inside Film Independent Spirit Award for My Tehran for Sale, and In 2012 won the Best Short Fiction Film award at the inaugural Australian Academy of Cinema and Television Arts Awards for The Palace.

In February 2020 she was named one of South Australia's Top 50 Most Influential People by the Advertiser.

In October 2021 Croser won for an International Emmy Award for producing the television drama series for children First Day.

References

External links 
 
 Official LinkedIn

Living people
Year of birth missing (living people)
Australian film producers